is a Japanese professional footballer who plays as a left back for Yokohama F. Marinos in the J1 League.

Youth career
Starting out as a forward for his elementary school, Nagato was advised by his junior high school manager to convert to a left-back – the position he still currently plays. He went on to study at the same school as his older brother, Yachiyo High School. Nagato and the team advanced to a couple of national championships, although they were knocked out in the first round of both. Nagato then went on to study and play for Hosei University – making 75 appearances and scoring 7 goals between 2013 and 2016.

Club career
In 2016, it was announced he would be joining J1 League side Vegalta Sendai. He made his debut in February 2017, playing 89 minutes in a 1-0 victory over Kashiwa Reysol, before being replaced by Tatsuya Masushima. He went on to make 17 appearances for the club in his debut preofessional season. In 2018, Nagato appeared in 29 games but only started 13 of those, struggling to hold down a place in the team. Manager Susumu Watanabe mainly played with a back three, with more attacking players Kunimitsu Sekiguchi and Yoshihiro Nakano often preferred on the left-hand side. Vegalta Sendai made it to the final of the 2018 Emperor's Cup, losing 1-0 in the final to Urawa Red Diamonds where Nagano was an unused substitute. He made two appearances in the competition.

Throughout the 2019 season, Nagato played in almost every game for Vegalta. Manager Watanabe initially deployed him as the left-sided centre back in his preferred back three, but he moved back to his favoured left-back position when a back four was introduced later in the season. He also scored his first goal for the club in a 2-1 league win over Gamba Osaka, with a deflected shot from outside of the box. Nagato impressed as a goal provider, especially from corners, racking up 10 league assists which was second only to Teruhito Nakagawa of Yokohama F. Marinos. Vegalta finished in 11th position in the league, exactly the same as in the 2018 season.

In 2020, Nagato left Vegalta Sendai to join Kashima Antlers, taking the number 14 shirt. Nagato made his first appearance in a continental competition in January, playing in the AFC Champions League qualifying play-offs, where Kashima fell to a 1-0 defeat to Melbourne Victory. The game was also his debut for Kashima, but he unfortunately missed a penalty in the defeat. He made 22 appearances in his first season in Kashima, despite missing a number of games at the end of the season after testing positive for COVID-19 in November 2020.

Career statistics

Notes

Honours
Vegalta Sendai
Emperor's Cup: 2018 Runners-up

References

External links

Profile at Vegalta Sendai
Profile at Kashima Antlers

1995 births
People from Sakura, Chiba
Association football people from Chiba Prefecture
Living people
Association football defenders
Japanese footballers
Vegalta Sendai players
Kashima Antlers players
Yokohama F. Marinos players
J1 League players